Low Lusatian German (in German: Niederlausitzer Mundart (also English: Low Lusatian dialect)) is a variety of Central German spoken in northern Saxony and southern Brandenburg within the regions of Lower Lusatia (Cottbus) and the northern part of Upper Lusatia (Hoyerswerda). It is well-defined from the Low German dialects around and north of Berlin, as well as the Upper Saxon dialect group of present-day Saxony and the Slavic language of the Sorbs.

Both regions were strongly influenced by different dialects, especially after World War II. Refugees from East Prussia and Silesia settled there after their dispossession from former German areas. After the foundation of the German Democratic Republic and an economical development because of a stronger extraction of lignite, people from Mecklenburg, Thuringia, Saxony, and Saxony-Anhalt moved to the Lusatia region to benefit from the development. Due to this influence of other German dialects, Low Lusatian never formed a too strong variation from standard German. For people moving now into this area, the dialect is easy to learn and influences their spoken language quite quickly.

Language

Low Lusatian German lacks region-specific words. It contains syncopes and apocopes, which are used in nearly every German dialect. The only somewhat different articulation is the guttural , where Standard German's   ending is instead  :

{| class="wikitable" style="margin: 1em auto 1em auto"
! rowspan="2"|English
! colspan="2"|Standard German
! colspan="2"|Lower Lusatian German
|-
! spelling
! IPA
! spelling
! IPA
|-
| to rake || harken ||  || haakn ||  
|-
| to work || arbeiten ||  || abeitn ||  
|-
| to buy || kaufen ||  || kohfn ||  
|-
| as well || auch ||  || ooch ||  
|-
| on || auf ||  || ohf || 
|-
| one || ein (m.) eine (f.)eines (n.) ||      || eeneeneeens ||      
|-
| small || kleine ||  || Kleene ||  
|}

The short   is spoken similarly to the Standard German  ( or ):

Another sign is a different form of the perfect:

References
Astrid Stedje (1987). Deutsche Sprache gestern und heute.'' Universitätstaschenbuchverlag
Columns of regional newspapers written in Low Lusatian German (http://www.lr-online.de)

Central German languages
German dialects
Languages of Germany